Der Film (engl. The Film) is the second studio album by German punk rock band Jennifer Rostock. It was released on July 10, 2009.  The album’s lead single, "Du Willst Mir An Die Wäsche", was released on June 26, 2009, and peaked at #34 of the German Albums Chart.

Track listing

All songs written by Jennifer Weist and Johannes "Joe" Walter.

Deluxe edition
Simultaneously to the release of the Der Film a limited fan edition of the album was released including:
A set of buttons
A poster
A casual bag
A 25-minute preview of the band-documentation "Es gibt nichts zu sehen, bitte sehen Sie her!" by Hannes Rossacher.

Chart performance

Album

Singles

References

2009 albums
Jennifer Rostock albums